Little Eve is a 2018 gothic horror novel by Catriona Ward.

Publication history 
The book was published in the United Kingdom in 2018. In 2022, following the success of Ward's novels The Last House on Needless Street and Sundial, it was republished in the United States.

Reception 
The book was well received by critics, and was given a starred review in Publishers Weekly. Lacy Baugher Milas, in a review for Paste, wrote that it was emblematic of Ward's work in the horror genre. Gabriel Iglesias, writing for Locus, similarly felt that it was "one of Ward's best books", praising the atmospheric setting and storytelling. John Mauro of GrimDark Magazine gave the film a score of four out of five, described it as "dense but absorbing, with a hypnotic quality akin to staring in the unblinking eyes of a giant snake." The book won the 2018 Shirley Jackson Award and the 2019 British Fantasy Award.

References 
2010s horror novels
British horror novels
Novels set in Scotland
Weidenfeld & Nicolson books

Gothic novels